Steynsburg is a small town in the Walter Sisulu Local Municipality of the Joe Gqabi District Municipality, Eastern Cape province of South Africa. Steynsburg is located on the intersection of the R56 and R390.

It developed around the Reformed Church established in 1872 and has been administered by a village management board since 1874. Steynsburg is named after Douwe Gerbrandt Steyn, grandfather of President Paul Kruger.

Steynsburg has a well-established Provincial hospital.

Notable citizens
 Tank van Rooyen
 Johannes Cornelis van Rooy

References

External links

Populated places founded by Afrikaners
Populated places established in 1874
1874 establishments in the Cape Colony
Populated places in the Walter Sisulu Local Municipality